Gond-e Molla Isa (also Romanized as Gond-e Mollā ‘Īsá; also known as Gonbad-e Mollā ‘Īsá) is a village in Dasht-e Bil Rural District, in the Central District of Oshnavieh County, West Azerbaijan Province, Iran. At the 2006 census, its population was 841, in 175 families.

References 

Populated places in Oshnavieh County